The Ajax was a motorcycle manufactured in England between 1923 and 1924, using 147cc, 247cc, 269cc and 346cc engines from Villiers Engineering and Blackburne.

References

Motorcycle manufacturers of the United Kingdom